William Hagarty O'Leary (1836 - 15 February 1880) was an Irish doctor and politician.

O'Leary was born in Dublin as William Hagarty Leary; he later adopted the O'Leary form of the name. He and his wife had nine children. He became a fellow of the Royal College of Surgeons in 1871. He was elected Member of Parliament for Drogheda in 1874 and sat for the seat as a Home Ruler until his death in 1880. A contemporary remarked of him that "Mr. O'Leary spoke very eloquently, though somewhat floridly. In stature he was very short." He was buried in Glasnevin Cemetery.

References

External links 
 

Members of the Parliament of the United Kingdom for County Louth constituencies (1801–1922)
1836 births
1880 deaths
UK MPs 1874–1880
Drogheda